31 Comae Berenices (31 Com) is a yellow giant star in the constellation Coma Berenices. Its apparent magnitude is about 4.9 and slightly variable. It is a rare FK Comae Berenices variable, a variable star that spins rapidly and has large starspots on its surface. It is currently in the Hertzsprung gap and its outer envelope has just begun convection.  In 1989 it was given as a spectral standard for the class G0IIIp.

31 Com is the north galactic pole star, and occasionally goes by the informal name Polaris Galacticum Borealis, coined by Jim Kaler.

In Chinese astronomy, 31 Comae Berenices is called 郎將, Pinyin: Lángjiāng, meaning Captain of the Bodyguards, because this star is marking itself and stand alone in Captain of the Bodyguards asterism, Supreme Palace enclosure mansion (see : Chinese constellation).

References

Coma Berenices
G-type giants
Comae Berenices, 31
FK Comae Berenices variables
Comae Berenices, LS
Durchmusterung objects
111812
062763
4883